Anthony Smith  (3 August 1894 – 1964) was awarded the George Cross for "outstanding gallantry and devotion to duty in conditions of the utmost danger and difficulty" on 23 February 1944 in rescuing people from a bomb damaged building in the World's End area of Chelsea, London. A chimney sweep and shoemaker by trade, he was attached to the Chelsea Division of the Civil Defence Rescue Service.

First World War
At the outbreak of war in 1914, Smith enlisted in the Royal Marines Light Infantry, Chatham Division. He was posted to the Royal Marine Brigade of the Royal Naval Division and participated in the landings at ANZAC Cove in April 1915. Smith suffered a foot injury that required his evacuation to Chatham.

By December, Smith had recovered and rejoined his old battalion in France, where he fought in numerous actions including the Somme offensive of 1916. Smith's service in the Great War came to an end after a serious hand injury requiring amputation of three fingers resulted in invalidation from the Army in August 1917.

Anthony Smith returned to civilian life as a nightwatchman but returned to the family trade of chimney sweep in 1926.

Second World War
Smith tried to re-enlist on the outbreak of war in 1939 but his injury prevented this and instead had joined the Heavy Rescue Service based at Chatham, Kent.

23 February 1944
On the night of 23 February 1944, a lone German aircraft dropped two bombs, probably aimed at Lots Road Power Station. The bombs missed this target and fell on The Guinness Trust buildings on the corner of Edith Grove and King's Road.

The force of the explosion collapsed the buildings. Smith arrived soon after with the Heavy Rescue Squad. Many injured people were trapped in the fallen masonry and rubble and Smith heard the cries of one of them, a baker called Sam Mitchell, trapped in the basement.

Entering the basement through a gap in the debris, Smith was soon also trapped inside by further rubble. Smith persevered and located Mitchell in the rubble, freed him and dragged him to the rear of the building where he broke through a wall to safety.

Smith then joined his colleague Albert Littlejohn and re-entered the basement, which was being flooded with water from a broken main and rescued a woman. Smith and his colleagues worked all night freeing victims and recovering bodies.

In all, 76 people died that night but many others were rescued thanks to Tony Smith, Albert Littlejohn and their colleagues from the Heavy Rescue Squad.

George Cross citation

Smith was awarded the George Cross on 30 May 1944 and made a Freeman of the Borough of Chelsea in June of the same year.

Plaque
A plaque commemorating Smith's bravery on 23 February 1944 is located on Dovehouse Green, on the King's Road in Chelsea.

Post-war, Smith resumed his job as a chimney sweep and died a bachelor in 1964.

Burial
Smith was initially buried in an unmarked grave. In 1999 a new stone was dedicated by arrangement of the Royal Marines Association and supported by the Victoria Cross and George Cross Association, the Royal Marines Historical Societies and representatives from the Royal Borough of Kensington and Chelsea.

Sale of medals
Smith's medals were sold at auction in Sydney, Australia in April 2005 for AUS$20,000. His medals included:

George Cross
1914–15 Star
British War Medal 1914-18 (CH.18816 A.Smith. Pte. R.M.)
Victory Medal (CH.18816 A.Smith. Pte. R.M.)
Defence Medal
Coronation Medal 1953

See also
Pathe News item featuring Tony Smith shortly after his investiture

References

 Hissey, Terry – Come if ye Dare – The Civil Defence George Crosses, (2008), Civil Defence Assn

British recipients of the George Cross
Shoemakers
1894 births
1964 deaths
Military personnel from Hampshire
Place of death missing
Royal Marines ranks
Royal Marines personnel of World War I
Burials at North Sheen Cemetery
Civil Defence Service personnel